Radar Networks was a San Francisco–based company that aimed to develop Semantic Web applications for the general public. Its only public product was the website Twine. The company was founded in 2003 by Nova Spivack and Kristinn R. Thórisson. On March 11, 2010, Radar Networks was acquired by Evri Inc. On May 14, 2010, Twine was shut down, becoming a redirect to evri.com. On October 5, 2012, Evri laid off much of its staff and shut down its commercial offerings, including evri.com.

History 
The company was founded in 2003 by web entrepreneur Nova Spivack, grandson of Peter Drucker, and AI researcher Kristinn R. Thórisson. They were soon joined by Jim Wissner, who became the company's Chief Architect. Thórisson was CTO of Radar Networks until 2004 when he joined Reykjavik University.

In February 2008 the company raised a Series B venture round led by Velocity Interactive Group, Vulcan Capital and Draper Fisher Jurvetson.

The company's only product, Twine, was an online, social web service that was opened to the public on October 21, 2008.

Twine
Twine was an online, social web service that combined features of forums, wikis, online databases and newsgroups. It was announced on October 19, 2007 and remained in private status, offering limited invitations only for beta testing, until October 21, 2008 when it was opened to the public. Twine is Radar Networks' first consumer product.

Twine serviced information storage, authoring and discovery through its website and browser-based tools. The service, intended for regular web users, attempted to automate certain processes related to data categorization and keyword-association (tagging). The system employed natural language processing and machine learning to extract concepts from written text in user data and express it using RDF triples tied to a semantic taxonomy based on concepts mined from Wikipedia. This made it easier for machines to process the data and enabled specifying types of information to search for on the Twine website, such as "person" or "location". Twine could be classified as a social network as it also had features such as adding contacts, sending private messages and sharing information.

References

Companies based in San Francisco
Semantic Web companies
Companies established in 2003